William Donald Hultz (born December 16, 1940 in Moss Point, Mississippi) is a former American football defensive end in the National Football League.

As a teenager, Hultz began playing football at Mobile County High School in Grand Bay, Alabama. After graduating from high school, he played college football at the University of Southern Mississippi in Hattiesburg, Mississippi, where he played both offensive and defensive positions. In 1962, during Hultz's senior year, Southern Mississippi's football team won the UPI Small College National Championship.

Following college, Hultz signed as a free agent to play in the NFL with the Minnesota Vikings. He played his first season with the Vikings in 1963. Before the 1964 season he was traded as part of a 4-for-1 deal to the Philadelphia Eagles where he played the following 9 seasons. During those first ten years (both at Minnesota and Philadelphia) he wore the number 83. After the 1972 season he was traded to the Chicago Bears where he played his final season in 1973. During that final year he wore the number 67. While in the NFL, Hultz played defensive end, defensive tackle, and linebacker.

Hultz holds the NFL record for the most opponents' fumbles recovered in a season, nine, in 1963, his rookie season. See List of National Football League records (individual).

His brother, George Hultz, also played high school football at Grand Bay, Alabama and later at the University of Southern Mississippi. He was drafted in the 1961 NFL Draft by the St. Louis Cardinals and played one season in the NFL as an offensive tackle. Later, he worked as a professional wrestler for promoter Nick Gulas. He competed against Buddy Wolfe, another former NFL player, among others.

His son played college football and his grandson, Sam, plays in his town league.

References 

1940 births
Living people
People from Moss Point, Mississippi
American football defensive linemen
Southern Miss Golden Eagles football players
University of Southern Mississippi alumni
Minnesota Vikings players
Philadelphia Eagles players
Chicago Bears players
American male professional wrestlers
Professional wrestlers from Mississippi